Richland Township is one of eleven townships in Fountain County, Indiana, United States. As of the 2010 census, its population was 950 and it contained 423 housing units.

Geography
Indiana State Road 341 passes through both towns;  Indiana State Road 55 intersects State Road 341 in Newtown. The two unincorporated communities of Graham and Stephens Crossing both lie to the southwest of Newtown along the route of a former railroad which came out of Veedersburg and also passed through Mellott and continued east.

Cemeteries
The township contains these seven cemeteries: Greenbay, Hodson, Newtown, Oak Ridge, Old Baptist, Quirk and Short.

References

 United States Census Bureau cartographic boundary files
 U.S. Board on Geographic Names

External links
 Indiana Township Association
 United Township Association of Indiana

Townships in Fountain County, Indiana
Townships in Indiana